The 2014 Sparkassen ATP Challenger was a professional tennis tournament played on indoor hard courts in Ortisei, Italy between 3 and 9 November 2014. It was the fifth edition of the tournament which was part of the 2014 ATP Challenger Tour.

Singles main-draw entrants

Seeds

 1 Rankings are as of October 27, 2014.

Other entrants
The following players received wildcards into the singles main draw:
  Matteo Berrettini
  Matteo Donati
  Federico Gaio
  Andreas Seppi

The following players received special exempt into the singles main draw:
  Mirza Bašić

The following players received entry from the qualifying draw:
  Jan Hernych
  Nils Langer
  Alessandro Petrone
  Antonio Šančić

The following player received entry by a protected ranking:
  Sergei Bubka
  Philipp Petzschner

Champions

Singles

 Andreas Seppi def.  Matthias Bachinger 6–4, 6–3

Doubles

 Sergey Betov /  Aliaksandr Bury def.  James Cluskey /  Austin Krajicek 6–4, 5–7, [10–6]

External links
Official Website

Sparkassen ATP Challenger
Internazionali Tennis Val Gardena Südtirol
2014 in Italian tennis